This list includes libraries located in Boston, Massachusetts, active in the 19th century. Included are reading-rooms, circulating libraries, subscription libraries, public libraries, academic libraries, medical libraries, children's libraries, church libraries, and government libraries.

List of libraries

A
 Adjutant-General's Library
 Almshouse Library
 American Academy of Arts and Sciences Library
 American Baptist Union Library
 American Board of Commissioners for Foreign Missions Library, Mission House, Pemberton Square
 American Institute of Instruction Library
 American Peace Society Library
 American Statistical Association Library
 American Unitarian Association
 Mary Ashley, no.124 Charles St.
 Asylum and Farm School Library
B
 Backup's Circulating Library
 Luke Baker's circulating library, no.69 Court St.
 Berkeley Circulating Library
 Bigelow School Library
 Bixby's Circulating Library; L.W. Bixby, Washington St.
 William Pinson Blake and Lemuel Blake, circulating library at the Boston Book-Store, no.1, Cornhill
 Board of Trade Library
 Boston and Albany Railroad Library (est.1868)
 Boston Art Club Library
 Boston Athenaeum
 Boston Circulating Library, no.3 School St.; E. Penniman Jr.; no.5 Cornhill-Square
 Boston City Hospital Library
 Boston College Library
 Boston Library Society
 Boston Lunatic Hospital Library
 Boston Medical Library (1805-1826)
 Boston Medical Library (est. 1875)
 Boston Public Library
 Boston Society for Medical Improvement
 Boston Society of Natural History Library
 Boston Society of the New Jerusalem Church Library
 Boston Theological Library
 Boston Turnverein Library
 Boston University
 Boston University Library
 Boston University School of Medicine Library
 Boston University Theological Library
 Boston Young Men's Christian Union Library, no.20 Boylston
 Bowditch Library
 Bowdoin Literary Association
 Boylston Library
 Brattle Square Church Library
 Broadway Circulating Library
 Bromfield Street Church Library
 Eliza Brown, circulating library
 Bulfinch Place Chapel Library
 Burnham & Bros., no.60 Cornhill; Thomas Burnham, Perry Burnham
 Kezia Butler, no.82 Newbury Street
C
 Campbell's Circulating Library
 Carney Hospital Library
 Carter's Circulating Library
 Callender's Library, School St.; also known as the Shakespeare Library; Charles Callender, H.G. Callender
 Charlestown High School Library
 Christ Church Library
 Christian Unity Library
 Church Home for Orphans Library
 Church of the Advent Library
 City Point Circulating Library
 Clarendon Library, Clarendon St.
 W.B. Clarke's circulating library
 Columbian Circulating Library, no.43 Cornhill
 Columbian Social Library (est.1813), Boylston Hall
 Comer's Commercial College
 Congregational Library & Archives, corner of Beacon and Somerset
 Consumptives' Home Library
D
 Deaf Mute Library Association
 Democratic reading room, corner Congress St. and Congress Sq.
 Dorchester Athenaeum Library
 Dramatic Fund Association
 J.H. Duclos & Bro., no.57 Warren St.
E
 East Boston Library Association
 Ministerial Library of Eliot Church
F
 Caroline Fanning
 Farrer's Circulating Library
 First Christian Church Library
 First Universalist Church Library
 Frederick Fletcher, no.55 Meridian, East Boston
 Franklin Circulating Library, no.69 Court St.
 Franklin Typographical Society Library
G
 Gate of Heaven Church Library
 Library of the General Court
 General Theological Library (est.1860); no.12 West St.
 Gill's Circulating Library
 Good Samaritan Church Library
 Grand Lodge of Masons Library
 Grant & Brown, no.873 Washington St.
 Guild Library of Church of the Advent
H
 Halliday's Circulating Library, West St.
 Hancock Library, 42 Hancock; A. Boyden
 Handel and Haydn Library
 Harvard Chapel Library
 Harvard Musical Library
 Medical College of Harvard University Library
 C.W. Holbrook's circulating library; no.88 Dover
 Holy Trinity Church Library
 Home for Aged Women Library
 House of Correction Library
 House of Industry Library
 House of Reformation Library
J
 Jamaica Plain Circulating Library
 Joy Street Baptist Church Library
K
 Keating's Circulating Library; no.1027 Washington St.
 King's Chapel Library

L
 Ladies Circulating Library, Washington St.; N. Nutting, proprietor
 Lawrence Association Library
 R.L. Learned's circulating library, Tremont St.
 Lincoln School Library
 Lindsay's Circulating Library; George W. Lindsey, Washington St.
 Liscomb's Circulating Library
 Loring's Circulating Library; Loring's Select Library, Washington St.; A.K. Loring
 A.F. Low's circulating library, Meridian St.
 Lowe's Circulating Library
M
 Marine Board of Underwriters' Library
 Mariners' Exchange reading room, no.1 Lewis
 Mariner's House, North Square
 Thomas Marsh's circulating library, Beach St.
 Massachusetts College of Pharmacy
 Massachusetts Historical Society
 Massachusetts Horticultural Society Library
 Massachusetts Hospital
 Massachusetts New Church Union Library
 Massachusetts School for Idiotic and Feeble-minded Youth
 Massachusetts Society for Promotion of Agriculture
 Massachusetts State Library
 Massachusetts State Prison Library
 Massachusetts Teachers' Association
 Massachusetts Total Abstinence Society Library
 Mayhew and Baker's Juvenile Circulating Library, no.208 Washington St.
 McGrath's Circulating Library
 Mechanic Apprentices Library Association
 J.O. Mendum's circulating library, Tremont St.
 Mercantile Library Association Library
 Merchants Exchange reading room, Merchants Exchange building, State St.; "basement, Old State House"
 Merrill's Circulating Library; C.H. Merrill, no.1575 Washington St.
 Methodist Episcopal Church Library
 Catherine Moore's circulating library, no.436 Washington St.
 Mount Vernon Church Library
 Mount Vernon School for Young Ladies
 Munroe & Francis, juvenile library, no.4 Cornhill
 Musical Society Library

N
 New England Conservatory of Music Library
 New England Female Medical College
 New England Historic Genealogical Society
 New England Hospital Library
 New England Methodist Historical Society
 Norcross School Library
 North End Circulating Library, no.123 Hanover St.; Thomas Hiller Jr.
 Notre Dame Academy Library

O
 Odd Fellows' Library
 Old Colony Chapel Library
 Osgood's Circulating Library

P
 Paine's Circulating Library
 Samuel H. Parker's circulating library
 H.B. Payne & Co.'s circulating library
 Elizabeth Peabody's foreign circulating library, no.13 West St.
 William Pelham's circulating library, no.59 Cornhill
 Penitent Female Refuge Society Library
 F.W. Perkins' circulating library
 Library of Perkins Institution for the Blind
 Pioneer Circulating Library
 Prince Library

Q
 Quinn's Circulating Library

R
 Lydia Reed
 Republican Institution
 Republican Reading Room, Bromfield St.
 E.R. Rich & Son; no.477 West Broadway
 Roxbury Athenaeum Library
 Roxbury High School Library
S
 Sage's Circulating Library; William Sage, no.371 Tremont
 Sailors Home Library
 School of Technology Library
 Second Methodist Church Library
 W.F. & M.H. Shattuck, no.106 Main
 Shawmut Avenue Baptist Church Library
 Shawmut Mission Library
 Social Law Library
 Society to Encourage Studies at Home
 South End Circulating Library
 Mary Sprague's circulating library, no.9 Milk St.
 St. Francis de Sales Church Library
 St. Joseph Circulating Library
 St. Mary's Young Men's Sodality Library
 St. Stephen's Church Library
 State Agricultural Library
 Stoughton Street Church Library
 Suffolk Circulating Library; corner of Court and Brattle St.; N.S. Simpkins, J. Simpkins
 Sumner library, no.6 Winthrop block, East Boston
T
 Teuthorn's Circulating Library; Julius Teuthorn, no.10 Beach
 George Ticknor's private library, no.8 Park St.
 Toll-Gate Circulating Library, no.665 East Broadway
 D.A. Tompkins, no.127 Hanover St.
 Treadwell Library, Massachusetts General Hospital
U
 Union Circulating Library, no.4 Cornhill, corner of Water St.; William Blagrove
 Union Mission Church Library
 Unitarian Association Library
 S.R. Urbino, foreign circulating library
V
 Village Church Library
 Vine Street Congregational Church Library
W
 Walker's Circulating Library
 J.B. Walker, no.1392 Tremont
 Thomas O. Walker, no.68 Cornhill
 Warren Street Chapel Library
 Washington Circulating Library, no.38 Newbury St.
 Washington Circulating Library, no.11 School St.
 Washingtonian Home Library
 West Boston Library, Cambridge St.
 West Church Library
 West Roxbury Free library, Centre St.
 West Roxbury High School Library
 Whig reading room, no.144 Washington St.
 Winkley & Boyd's Central library
 Workingmen's Reading Room
Y
 Boston Young Men's Christian Association Library (YMCA), Tremont Temple
 Young Men's Christian Union
 Young Women's Christian Association (YWCA), no.68 Warrenton
 Young Men's Working Association Library
Z
 Zion Church Library

See also
 Books in the United States
 List of libraries in 18th century Massachusetts
 List of booksellers in Boston

References

Further reading

External links
 Princeton University. Davies Project. American Libraries before 1876.

Libraries
 
Libraries
Libraries
Libraries in Boston
Libraries in 19th-century Boston
Boston
Libraries, 19th century Boston